Šiška is a place name that may refer to:

 Šiška District, a district of the city of Ljubljana, Slovenia
 Spodnja Šiška, a former village annexed by the city of Ljubljana, Slovenia
 Zgornja Šiška, a former village annexed by the city of Ljubljana, Slovenia
 Misspelling for Šišká, Sami spelling for Sjisjka, Sweden